Louise Laffon (1828–1885), was a French photographer and painter.  She was one of the first female professional photographers in France. She had a studio in Paris between 1859 and 1876.

References 

1828 births
1885 deaths
19th-century French photographers